Salvus is a Latin adjective meaning "safe". It may refer to:

 Siebe Gorman Salvus, a British industrial rescue and shallow water oxygen rebreather
 Salvus Water, a spa in Bükkszék, Hungary

See also
 
 Salvius (disambiguation), an open source humanoid robot